Glenbrook Beach is a rural community at the northern end of a peninsula formed between the Waiuku River and Taihiki River in Auckland, New Zealand. Waiuku is 14 km south by road.

The area is also known as Kawahai, after a species of fish which has been a substantial food source for the local Ngāti Te Ata iwi.

Glenbrook Beach was first subdivided in the mid 1920s. Electric power supply was connected at the end of the decade.

Demographics
Glenbrook Beach is part of the larger Glenbrook statistical area.

Glenbrook Beach had a population of 303 at the 2018 New Zealand census, an increase of 3 people (1.0%) since the 2013 census, and an increase of 27 people (9.8%) since the 2006 census. There were 117 households, comprising 147 males and 156 females, giving a sex ratio of 0.94 males per female. The median age was 40.2 years (compared with 37.4 years nationally), with 66 people (21.8%) aged under 15 years, 45 (14.9%) aged 15 to 29, 150 (49.5%) aged 30 to 64, and 42 (13.9%) aged 65 or older.

Ethnicities were 88.1% European/Pākehā, 17.8% Māori, 5.0% Pacific peoples, 5.0% Asian, and 2.0% other ethnicities. People may identify with more than one ethnicity.

Although some people chose not to answer the census's question about religious affiliation, 60.4% had no religion, 24.8% were Christian, 2.0% had Māori religious beliefs and 1.0% had other religions.

Of those at least 15 years old, 39 (16.5%) people had a bachelor's or higher degree, and 36 (15.2%) people had no formal qualifications. The median income was $31,600, compared with $31,800 nationally. 45 people (19.0%) earned over $70,000 compared to 17.2% nationally. The employment status of those at least 15 was that 126 (53.2%) people were employed full-time, 27 (11.4%) were part-time, and 15 (6.3%) were unemployed.

References

Populated places in the Auckland Region
Populated places around the Manukau Harbour